Clyde Clifton "Junior" McNeal (December 15, 1928 – April 14, 1996) was an American professional baseball shortstop in the Negro leagues, minor leagues and in the Mexican League. He played from 1945 to 1957 with several teams. McNeal played for the Chicago American Giants from 1945 to 1950. He also played in the Brooklyn Dodgers minor league system from 1953 to 1957, and with the Sultanes de Monterrey in 1955.

References

External links
 and Baseball-Reference Black Baseball stats and Seamheads

1928 births
1996 deaths
Chicago American Giants players
Elmira Pioneers players
Montreal Royals players
Newport News Dodgers players
Pueblo Dodgers players
Cedar Rapids Raiders players
Baseball players from Texas
Sportspeople from Texas
20th-century African-American sportspeople
Baseball infielders
Bismarck Barons players
Sultanes de Monterrey players
American expatriate baseball players in Mexico